Kodža Mehmet Beg Mosque is a Sunni mosque in the village of Tabanovce, Kumanovo Municipality, North Macedonia.

See also
Islamic Religious Community of Macedonia
Muftiship of Kumanovo
Kumanovo

References

External links
 Се уриваат џамии стари 6 века, се градат нови, бетонски Article about Ottoman Mosques in Macedonia Including Kodza Mehmet Beg Mosque. novamakedonija.com.mk 14.12.2010
Исламското културно наследство жртва на негрижата Article  No. 2 about Ottoman Mosques in Macedonia Including Kodza Mehmet Beg Mosque. dw.de 05.12.2010

Kumanovo Municipality
Mosques in North Macedonia